Platon the Studite, also Plato of Sakkoudion, probably Constantinople, ca. 735 – Constantinople, 4 April 814, was a Byzantine minor official who became a monk in 759. After refusing the metropolitan see of Nicomedia or the headship of a monastery in Constantinople, in 783 he founded the monastery of Sakkoudion on Mount Olympus in Bithynia, of which he became the first abbot. He is notable, along with his nephew Theodore Stoudites, for his iconodule stance during the Byzantine Iconoclasm and his participation in the Second Council of Nicaea, and to his firm opposition to the second marriage of Emperor Constantine VI to his (Platon's) niece Theodote (the "Moechian Controversy"). He was canonized by the Church, and his feast day is April 4.

References

Sources

External links
 Catholic Online: Plato
 Santiebeati: Plato of Sakkoudion

730s births
814 deaths
8th-century Byzantine people
9th-century Byzantine people
9th-century Christian saints
Byzantine abbots
Byzantine Iconoclasm
Byzantine saints
People from Constantinople
Saints from Anatolia
Founders of Christian monasteries